A Pallet Shuttle Barge or PSB is a cargo ship designed to operate on inland waterways for the transport of goods on pallets or in big bags. It is a type of catamaran with two parallel hulls supporting a vast cargo deck. It was designed to offer a competitive alternative to freighter trucks to reduce traffic congestion and carbon emissions. One PSB has the same loading capacity as 10 cargo trucks cutting carbon emissions by a third.

Compared with traditional freighters the PSB also offers a number of advantages:
 A small draft (2,2 m when fully laden) allowing access to undeep waterways
 A safe and shorter loading and unloading process because the goods do not need to be moved into containers first.
 Goods are transported directly on deck, not placed in a hold. The deck offers space for 200 pallets per layer, stacked up to at least 4 m high.
 Smaller size barges resulting in lower operational costs and allowing access to smaller inland waterways.
 Equipped with its own crane enabling independent loading and unloading, requiring little or no port infrastructure.
 Equipped with Azimuth thruster propulsion and bow-thrusters using less power than trucks to transport the same quantities.
 No living accommodation on board of the barge.
 Operable by single crew.

History 
The Pallet Shuttle Barge was invented by Antoon Van Coillie. The first one was built in 2014 and was commissioned by Blue Line Logistics nv.

Capacity 
It has a carrying capacity of 300 T or 198 euro pallets.

In a further development of the PSB concept, 2 larger units called Maxi ZULU with a carrying capacity of 450T will be built in 2020.

Dimensions 
Its standard dimensions are 50 m long and 6,6 m wide. Its draft is up to 2,2 m when fully laden.

The Maxi ZULU version is planned to be 54 m long and 8 m wide, its draft will still be limited to 2,2 m at full load.

Fleet 
Currently there are two Pallet Shuttle Barges. They carry the name ZULU. The PSB fleet will be expanded to 30 or 40 vessels.

References

Barges